Dzhabarov is a surname. Notable people with the surname include: 

Vladik Dzhabarov, Soviet cyclist
Vladimir Dzhabarov (born 1952), Uzbek-born Russian statesman, politician, and government agent

Russian-language surnames